Bou-Hedma National Park is located in both the Gafsa Governorate and Sidi Bouzid Governorate, in Tunisia. The park was created on December 18, 1980, and has been on the UNESCO tentative list of World Heritage Sites since May 28, 2008

The national park is mainly important because of its flora and fauna. Endangered species that have been reintroduced here include scimitar oryx (Oryx dammah), addax (Addax nasomaculatus), ostrich (Struthio camelus camelus) and dama gazelle (Gazella dama mhorr). 

Bou-Hedma is an important archaeological site. Starting with the ancient Roman settlements that occupied this place, such as the remains of Roman villages, the Roman bridge of Wadi Bautista, the ancient Roman pools and the rest of the Roman aqueduct.

References

Lakes of Tunisia
National parks of Tunisia
Biosphere reserves of Tunisia
Protected areas established in 1980
Archaeological sites in Tunisia
Ramsar sites in Tunisia
World Heritage Tentative List